The Smart Connect Interchange, also known as the Harbor Link Interchange and the Mindanao Avenue Interchange, is a two-level cloverleaf interchange in Valenzuela, Metro Manila, the Philippines which serves as the junction of North Luzon Expressway (NLEx) between its main segment and its Harbor Link project, particularly Segments 8.1 and 9, components of Circumferential Road 5 (C-5). Built as part of the  NLEX Segment 8.1 of the Harbor Link project extending the expressway to Mindanao Avenue, which has since been incorporated into the C-5 system, it is the Philippines' largest cloverleaf interchange in terms of land area.

History
Construction of NLEX Segment 8.1, including the Smart Connect Interchange, broke ground on April 2, 2009, with actual construction work beginning 19 days later.

The entire segment was opened to traffic on June 5, 2010, with President Gloria Macapagal Arroyo and Manuel V. Pangilinan, chairman of the Manila North Tollways Corporation, the concessionaire of the North Luzon Expressway, leading the inauguration along with Public Works and Highways Secretary Victor Domingo and high-ranking officials from Valenzuela.  With some 30,000 vehicles estimated to use the new road daily during its first year of operation, since its opening it has helped to relieve traffic on the older Balintawak Interchange connecting Epifanio de los Santos Avenue (EDSA) to NLEX, which is three times smaller.

Although the Smart Connect Interchange was opened to traffic in 2010, it originally only carried traffic between Valenzuela and eastern Metro Manila via NLEX Segment 8.1, with the westbound ramps closed to traffic. Work on a connection between the interchange and western Metro Manila would only be realized with the construction of the  NLEx Segment 9 between the interchange and the MacArthur Highway in Karuhatan, which was opened on March 19, 2015. A further extension from Karuhatan to the Port of Manila, known as NLEX Segment 10 or NLEX Harbor Link, was opened gradually from February 28, 2019 to June 15, 2020.

On November 16, 2012, Smart Communications bought the naming rights to the interchange, giving it its current name.

References

Road interchanges in the Philippines